Heaven Street Seven (also known as HS7) was a Hungarian alternative rock band founded in 1995 by Krisztián Szűcs, Róbert Németh and Gyula Orbán. Later that year Gábor Balczer joined the band.

History
In 2006 Heaven Street Seven won an EBBA Award. Every year the European Border Breakers Awards (EBBA) recognize the success of ten emerging artists or groups who reached audiences outside their own countries with their first internationally released album in the past year.

Discography
Albums
Tick Tock No Fear (1995) 
Goal (1997)
Budapest Dolls (1998)
Cukor (2000) 
Kisfilmek a nagyvilágból (2002)
Szállj ki és gyalogolj (2004)
Tick Tock No Fear (2005)
Tudom, hogy szeretsz titokban (2006) 
Sordid Little Symphonies (2007) 
Jazz (2008)

See also
Budapest indie music scene
Zoltán Takács

External links
Heaven Street Seven Official Site

Hungarian alternative rock groups
English-language singers from Hungary